Beng is a village in Kah Rural District, Central District, Davarzan County, Razavi Khorasan Province, Iran. At the 2006 census, its population was 11, in 5 families.

See also 

 List of cities, towns and villages in Razavi Khorasan Province

References 

Populated places in Davarzan County